Anton Biegel is an Austrian retired slalom canoeist who competed in the mid-to-late 1960s. He won a bronze medal in the C-2 team event at the 1963 ICF Canoe Slalom World Championships in Spittal.

References

External links 
 Anton BIEGEL at CanoeSlalom.net

Austrian male canoeists
Possibly living people
Year of birth missing (living people)
Medalists at the ICF Canoe Slalom World Championships